The Tallons is the second novel in Alabama author William March’s “Pearl County” collection of novels and short fiction. It is an example of the Southern Gothic genre. Like its predecessor, Come in at the Door and sequel, The Looking-Glass, The Tallons is set in the mythical towns of Reedyville and Baycity, the latter offering a fictionalized vision of Mobile, Alabama. The book was first published in 1936 by Random House in New York and republished by the University of Alabama Press in 2015.

The novel centers on the Tallon brothers, Jim and Andrew, who become entangled in a romantic triangle with Myrtle Bickerstaff. An older Tallon brother, Brad, was a minor character in the first book in March's "Pearl County" series, the 1934 novel Come in at the Door.

References

1936 American novels
Southern Gothic novels
Novels by William March